George Dennis may refer to:

George Dennis (explorer) (1814–1898), British explorer, the author of The Cities and Cemeteries of Etruria
George R. Dennis (1822–1882), American Senator from Maryland

See also

Sir George Denys, 1st Baronet